Luís Fernando Quintas dos Santos, known as Quintas (born 12 April 1965) is a former Portuguese football player.

Club career
He made his Primeira Liga debut for Beira-Mar on 21 August 1998 in a game against Braga.

Honours
Beira-Mar
Taça de Portugal: 1998–99

References

External links
 

1965 births
People from Torres Novas
Living people
Portuguese footballers
A.C. Alcanenense players
O Elvas C.A.D. players
Liga Portugal 2 players
C.F. Os Belenenses players
U.D. Leiria players
F.C. Penafiel players
C.D. Feirense players
S.C. Beira-Mar players
Primeira Liga players
C.D. Nacional players
A.D. Camacha players
Association football forwards
U.R. Mirense players
Sportspeople from Santarém District